Elizaveta Tamerlanovna Shanaeva (born 30 May 2003) is a Russian competitive ice dancer. With her former skating partner, Devid Naryzhnyy, she is the 2020 World Junior bronze medalist and the 2019–20 Junior Grand Prix Final bronze medalist. She has also won three medals on the ISU Junior Grand Prix series, including gold medals at 2019 France and 2019 Russia.

Personal life 
Elizaveta Tamerlanovna Shanaeva was born on 30 May 2003 in Alania, Russia.

Career

Early years 
Shanaeva began learning to skate in 2005. She skated with Sergei Semko before teaming up with Devid Naryzhnyy during the 2016–2017 season. They are coached by Irina Zhuk and Alexander Svinin.

Shanaeva/Naryzhnyy placed first at the 2017 Moscow Championship.

2018–2019 season 
Shanaeva/Naryzhnyy received their first ISU Junior Grand Prix (JGP) assignments in the 2018–2019 season. They won silver medals at 2018 JGP event in Bratislava, Slovakia and placed 4th at 2018 JGP event in Yerevan, Armenia.

In November 2018, they won the junior gold medal at the 2018 Grand Prix of Bratislava. They placed fourth at the 2019 Russian Junior Championships.

2019–2020 season 

Returning to the Junior Grand Prix, Shanaeva/Naryzhnyy won their first JGP gold medal in September at the 2019 JGP France in Courchevel. Three weeks later, they won a second gold medal at the 2019 JGP Russia in Chelyabinsk. With these results, they qualified for the 2019–20 ISU Junior Grand Prix Final in Torino.  Shanaeva/Naryzhnyy placed third in the rhythm dance there, with her describing them as "quite happy" with their performance.  They were also third in the free dance, despite Naryzhnyy missing a twizzle level, and won the bronze medal.

After winning the junior national title at the 2020 Russian Junior Championships, Shanaeva/Naryzhnyy were assigned to compete at the 2020 World Junior Championships in Tallinn, Estonia.  First in the free dance, they won a small gold medal for the segment, becoming the only team to score above 70 points in the junior rhythm dance that season.  Third in the free dance, they dropped to third place overall and won the bronze medal.  Shanaeva said, "we got a lot of energy to show our maximum next season and to be ready to beat everyone."

2020–2021 season 
After junior Russian test skates in August, both became ill with COVID-19, first Shanaeva and then Naryzhnyy. This caused them to miss the first half of the season, competing only in December, on the fifth stage of the domestic Cup of Russia series, but having to withdraw after the rhythm dance due to Naryzhnyy getting food poisoned. 

At the beginning of February, they competed on the 2021 Russian Junior Championships in Krasnoyarsk, placing third in the rhythm dance, second in the free dance and second overall. They claimed to be happy with their performances after such a difficult period, defining their result as a "silver medal with a golden shine." 

They were scheduled to participate in the Russian Cup Final in Moscow but withdrew due to medical reasons. On the 17 and 18 of April, they performed in Team Tutberidze’s show Champions on Ice in Krasnodar and Sochi.

2021–2022 season 
Moving to the international senior level, Shanaeva/Naryzhnyy won the bronze medal at the Budapest Trophy. They went on to make their senior Grand Prix debut at the 2021 Skate Canada International, where they finished in ninth place. 

In December, Shanaeva/Naryzhnyy competed on the 2022 Russian Championship in Saint Petersburg, placing eighth in the rhythm dance and fifth in the free dance and finishing fifth overall.

Programs

With Drozd

With Naryzhnyy

Competitive highlights 
GP: Grand Prix; CS: Challenger Series; JGP: Junior Grand Prix

With Drozd

With Naryzhnyy

With Semko

Detailed results 
Small medals awarded only at ISU Championships. ISU personal bests highlighted in bold.

With Naryzhnyy

Senior results

Junior results

References

External links 
 
 

2003 births
Russian female ice dancers
Living people
People from North Ossetia–Alania
World Junior Figure Skating Championships medalists